Peter Gál-Andrezly (born 3 May 1990) is a Slovak professional footballer who plays as a midfielder for Romanian club FK Csíkszereda.

Career
The Slovak Gal-Andrezly began his career with MFK Kosice and was in 2007 promoted to the seniorside of the Corgoň Liga. Middlesbrough signed him in January 2009 on loan for 6 months. He joined the Middlesbrough reserve team. After the end of the loan contract with Middlesbrough F.C. turned back to MFK Kosice on 1 July 2009. Gal-Andrezly two guest appearances for Shamrock Rovers in friendlies against Newcastle and Real Madrid in July 2009 at Tallaght Stadium and then had a trial spell with Charlton Athletic F.C.

International career
Gál-Andrezly was a member of the Slovakia national under-19 football team and presented the team in the 2009 UEFA European Under-19 Football Championship qualification.

Personal life
His father Daniel Gál-Andrezly is currently the head coach of MFK Spartak Medzev of the II. Slovenská Futbalová Liga.

Career statistics

Club

Notes and references

External links
 
 MFK Košice profile

Living people
1990 births
Sportspeople from Košice
Association football midfielders
Slovak footballers
FC VSS Košice players
FK Železiarne Podbrezová players
MFK Ružomberok players
Shamrock Rovers F.C. guest players
Middlesbrough F.C. players
1. SC Znojmo players
Sepsi OSK Sfântu Gheorghe players
Czech First League players
Slovak Super Liga players
Liga I players
Slovak expatriate footballers
Slovak expatriate sportspeople in England
Expatriate footballers in England
Expatriate footballers in the Czech Republic
Slovak expatriate sportspeople in Romania
Expatriate footballers in Romania
Slovakia youth international footballers